Toxabramis hoffmanni is a species of ray-finned fish in the genus Toxabramis. It is found in Guangxi, China.

References

Toxabramis
Freshwater fish of China
Fish described in 1934